Iryna Brémond (née Kuryanovich) (born 5 October 1984) is a French former tennis player.

Her highest WTA ranking in singles is 93, which she reached on 20 February 2012. Her career-high in doubles is 162, achieved on 25 June 2007. Brémond won 15 singles titles and 11 doubles titles on the ITF Women's Circuit in her career.

In 2011, she married her coach, Gérald Brémond, consequently choosing to play for France instead of Belarus, her birth nation.

ITF Circuit finals

Singles: 21 (15 titles, 6 runner-ups)

Doubles: 30 (11 titles, 19 runner-ups)

External links
 
 

1984 births
Living people
Belarusian female tennis players
French female tennis players
Tennis players from Minsk